Coleophora aliquanta is a moth of the family Coleophoridae. It is found in Mongolia.

References

aliquanta
Moths described in 1979
Moths of Asia